Saiee Manjrekar (born 23 December 1997) is an Indian actress who works in Hindi, Marathi and Telugu-language films. Daughter of actors Mahesh Manjrekar and Medha Manjrekar, she made her acting debut with Dabangg 3 (2019), for which she received Filmfare Award for Best Female Debut nomination. She has since appeared in Ghani and Major (both 2022).

Early life 
Manjrekar was born on 23 December 1997 to film actors Medha and Mahesh Manjrekar. She studied at Dhirubhai Ambani International School, Mumbai and University of Mumbai.

Career 
Manjrekar made her film debut with a brief appearance as Kushi Damle in the Marathi film Kaksparsh (2012). She did her first leading role played Khushi Chautala in the 2019 Hindi film action-comedy Dabangg 3 opposite Salman Khan. The film received negative reviews from critics, and its commercially prospects were affected by the CAA protests. It earned her a Filmfare Award for Best Female Debut nomination. In 2020, she appeared in the music video for the song "Manjha", alongside Aayush Sharma.

In 2022, Manjrekar made her Telugu film debut alongside Varun Tej in Ghani, which ended up to be a commercial failure. She was next featured in the Telugu-Hindi bilingual biographical action film Major, a biopic of Sandeep Unnikrishnan (played by Adivi Sesh), in which she played the role of Isha Agarwal Unnikrishnan's love interest. The film received critical acclaim for its performances, direction and became commercial success with one of the highest grossing Telugu films of 2022.

Manjrekar will next appear in Kuch Khattaa Ho Jaay opposite Guru Randhawa.

In the media 
Manjrekar was ranked 47th in the Times Most Desirable Women List in 2019.

Filmography

Films

Music videos

Awards and nominations

See also 
 List of Hindi film actresses

References

External links 

 
 

Living people
1998 births
Actresses from Mumbai
Indian film actresses
Marathi actors
Actresses in Hindi cinema
Actresses in Telugu cinema
Actresses in Marathi cinema
21st-century Indian actresses